Hillcrest Middle School may refer to:
 Hillcrest Middle School, School District 43 Coquitlam
 Hillcrest Middle School, Deer Valley Unified School District
 Hillcrest Middle School, Gravenstein Union School District
 Hillcrest Middle School, Greenville County Schools
 Hillcrest Middle School, Trumbull, Connecticut
 Hillcrest Middle School, Tuscaloosa County School System
 Hillcrest Middle School, Ysleta Independent School District